Wang Liping (born 12 November 1973) is a Chinese former footballer who played as a defender or midfielder. She competed in the 1996, 2000 and 2004 Summer Olympics.

In 1996 she won the silver medal with the Chinese team. She played all five matches.

Four years later she finished fifth with the Chinese team in the women's tournament. She played all three matches.

In 2004, she finished ninth with the Chinese team in the 2004 women's tournament. She played both matches.

She played for the Atlanta Beat in the Women's United Soccer Association in 2002.

References

External links

profile

1973 births
Living people
Chinese women's footballers
China women's international footballers
Footballers at the 1996 Summer Olympics
Footballers at the 2000 Summer Olympics
Footballers at the 2004 Summer Olympics
Olympic footballers of China
Olympic silver medalists for China
Olympic medalists in football
1995 FIFA Women's World Cup players
1999 FIFA Women's World Cup players
2003 FIFA Women's World Cup players
Footballers from Hebei
Asian Games medalists in football
Footballers at the 1994 Asian Games
Footballers at the 1998 Asian Games
Medalists at the 1996 Summer Olympics
Asian Games gold medalists for China
Women's association football defenders
Medalists at the 1994 Asian Games
Medalists at the 1998 Asian Games
FIFA Century Club
Atlanta Beat (WUSA) players
Women's United Soccer Association players
Women's association football midfielders